The Copa Argentina de Básquet (English: Argentina Cup of Basketball) was an Argentine men's professional club basketball national cup competition. The competition was contested between the teams of the top-tier level Argentine League (LNB), and the second-tier level Argentine 2nd Division.

History
The Copa Argentina was contested from 2002 to 2010.

Winners

See also
LNB
Torneo Súper 8
Torneo Top 4
Torneo InterLigas

External links
Official website 
Pick and Roll (news, info & statistics) 
Argentinian league on Latinabasket.com

2002 establishments in Argentina
Basketball cup competitions in Argentina
Basketball cup competitions in South America